Xiaodong Zou (born 1964) is a Chinese-Swedish chemist who is a professor at Stockholm University. Her research considers the development of electron diffraction for the three dimensional characterisation of materials. She is a member of the Nobel Committee for Chemistry. She was elected to the Royal Swedish Academy of Sciences and the Royal Swedish Academy of Engineering Sciences.

Early life and education 
Zou was an undergraduate student at Peking University, where she majored in physics. She moved to the Beijing University of Technology for graduate studies, where she specialised in the physics of metals. At Beijing, she worked alongside K.H. Kuo, a chemical engineer. She moved to Sweden as a doctoral researcher, where she worked in structural chemistry at Stockholm University. Her doctoral research considered electron crystallography and how it could be used to understand inorganic and biological structures. After earning her doctorate, she joined Lund University, where she worked alongside David Veblen.

Research and career 
In 1996, Zou joined the faculty at Stockholm University, where she was made professor in 2005. Her research involves uncovering the atomic structures of nanosized crystals using electron crystallography. She has demonstrated that transmission electron microscopy can be used to determine the structure of zeolites and mesoporous crystals, as well as metal–organic frameworks, covalent organic frameworks and protein microcrystals. She has developed quantitative analysis software to facilitate the analysis of electron microscopy images, with a particular focus on three-dimensional electron diffraction.

Zou launched the Berzelii Center EXSELENT on Porous Materials in 2006, and served as director for 6 years.

Awards and honours 
 2002 Tage Erlander Prize
 2008 Stockholm University Göran Gustafsson Prize
 2010 K.H. Kuo Award
 2012 Swedish Chemical Society Arrhenius medal

Selected publications

References 

Living people
1964 births
Chinese emigrants to Sweden
Chinese chemists
Swedish chemists
Peking University alumni
Beijing University of Technology alumni
Stockholm University alumni
Academic staff of Lund University
20th-century women scientists
21st-century women scientists